Paradrypetes is a plant genus under the family Rhizophoraceae. It is sometimes included in the Picrodendraceae and was formerly included in the family Euphorbiaceae.

References

Rhizophoraceae
Malpighiales genera